The National Defense Reserve Fleet (NDRF) consists of ships of the United States, mostly merchant vessels, that have been mothballed but can be activated within 20 to 120 days to provide shipping during national military emergencies, or non-military emergencies such as commercial shipping crises.

The NDRF is managed by the U.S. Department of Transportation's Maritime Administration (MARAD). It is distinct from the United States Navy reserve fleets, which consist largely of naval vessels.

NDRF vessels are at the fleet sites at James River, Virginia (James River Reserve Fleet); Beaumont, Texas (Beaumont Reserve Fleet); and Suisun Bay, California (Suisun Bay Reserve Fleet); and at designated outported berths. Former anchorage sites included Stony Point, New York (Hudson River Reserve Fleet); Wilmington, North Carolina; Mobile, Alabama; Astoria, Oregon; and Olympia, Washington.

Through the 2010s, the oldest, most decrepit hulls at Suisun Bay were stripped of toxic materials, then broken up in Texas, California, or Asia. Twenty of the most polluting mothball ships were recycled by 2012, and another 32 by 2017.

At its peak, in 1950, the NDRF had 2,277 ships in lay-up. In 2003, it had 274. In July 2007, it held 230 ships, primarily dry-cargo ships, with some tankers, military auxiliaries, and other types. In December 2021, the number of ships was down to 91.

History
The NDRF was established under Section 11 of the Merchant Ship Sales Act of 1946 to serve as a reserve of ships for national defense and national emergencies.

NDRF vessels were used in seven wars and crises:
During the Korean War, 540 vessels were broken out to move military forces.
During a worldwide tonnage shortfall in 1951–53, more than 600 ships were reactivated to carry coal to Northern Europe and grain to India.
From 1955 through 1964, another 600 ships were used to store grain for the Department of Agriculture.
Another 223 cargo ships and 29 tankers were activated during a tonnage shortfall after the Suez Canal was closed in 1956.
During the Berlin Crisis of 1961, 18 vessels were activated and remained in service until 1970.
Another 172 vessels were activated for the Vietnam War.

Ready Reserve Force
In 1976, a Ready Reserve Force component was established as a subset of the NDRF to provide rapid deployment of military equipment and later became known as the Ready Reserve Force, which numbers 72 vessels.  These are crewed with a reduced crew but kept available for activation within four, five, ten or twenty days.

An additional 28 ships are held under United States Maritime Administration (MARAD) custody for other Government agencies on a cost-reimbursable basis.

Operations

Vessels with military utility or logistic value are held in retention status and are in a preservation program that is designed to keep them in the same condition as when they enter the fleet. The internal spaces are dehumidified to slow the corrosion of metal and the growth of mold and mildew.  DC power is distributed through anodes to the exterior underwater portions of the hull, creating an electric field that suppresses corrosion and preserves the surface of the hull. External painting and other cosmetic work are generally deferred since they do not affect the ability to activate and operate the vessel.

MARAD is authorized as the government's disposal agent through the NDRF program for merchant type vessels equal to or greater than 1,500 gross tons.  A state agency can file an application to request title to a vessel "as-is where-is" from the NDRF for the purpose of creating an artificial reef. A total of 51 vessels have been transferred to 10 states under the program including: Texas (12), Florida (10), North Carolina (7), Virginia (6), Alabama (5), Mississippi (5), Georgia (2), South Carolina (2), California (1), and New Jersey (1). Of the 132 non-retention vessels in the NDRF, there are 117 that are being prepared for disposal.

The NDRF program can give and lend historic artifacts to maritime-heritage organizations and transfer entire ships to memorial associations through special legislation.

Reserve Fleet Inactive naval ships of merchant design, including amphibious ships but not ships maintained in a mobilization status by MARAD for Military Sealift Command (MSC), may be laid up in the NDRF when overcrowded berthing conditions exist at a Navy Inactive Ship Maintenance Facility. Battleships, cruisers, and aircraft carriers which have been stricken or those awaiting final disposition may be transferred to MARAD locations for berthing. Initially, these ships will be transferred to MARAD for caretaking in accordance with the Economy Act of 1932.

Ships transferred to the NDRF may be retained in Navy Mobilization Plans and maintained by MARAD under priorities set by the Department of the Navy. If the Navy decides it no longer needs the ship, the Secretary of the Navy strikes the ship from the Naval Vessel Register and transfers the title to MARAD. When possible, MARAD gets first disposition rights, which allows it to convert merchant ships to the Ready Reserve Force (RRF) or to sell the ship for scrapping in connection with the Merchant Marine Act of 1936, Sec. 508, and use the proceeds to buy more supply ships.

Fleet reduction

The Suisun Bay location contained 324 ships in 1959. Forty years later, the number was down by about 250, but pollutants had begun to accumulate in the area.  Paint containing toxins such as lead, copper, zinc and barium had been flaking off many of the ships' hulls and superstructures. By June 2007, some 21 tons of toxic paint debris was estimated to have been shed from the ships, to settle in the bay sediment. A further 65 tons of paint was estimated to be in danger of flaking off.

David Matsuda, acting administrator of MARAD, said in March 2010 "We are moving expeditiously to remove the worst-polluting ships first and diligently moving to clean the rest." Some 52 ships were identified as problematic, and were scheduled for removal and recycling by September 2017.  The process began in October 2009; as of October 2012, 36 ships had been removed and the disposal effort was ahead of schedule. One such vessel, the SS Winthrop, the last Victory ship of the California mothball fleet, was towed in March 2010 to BAE Systems San Francisco Ship Repair dock to be cleaned of barnacles and plant matter before its final journey to ship breakers in Brownsville, Texas. The hull cleaning was prescribed by the U.S. Coast Guard to prevent the spread of California species to other locations. Some of the recycling work may be completed in the San Francisco Bay Area, specifically at the former Mare Island Naval Shipyard—an application for such work is under permit review. Some $38 million in federal funds will be used to complete the dismantling project.

List of NDRF ships
:

See also

Reserve fleet
Suisun Bay Reserve Fleet
United States Navy reserve fleets
 U.S. Merchant Marine Academy
Ready Reserve Fleet Alameda

References

External links

 NDRF inventory archive
 U.S. Maritime Administration, a division of the US Department of Transportation. (This article incorporates material taken from that public domain website.)
 National Defense Reserve Fleet (NDRF) at the Federation of American Scientists' website.
 Ship inventory of the NDRF as at July 31 2014 (More recent records, when available, may be accessed by changing the last part of the link URL, using the format /iyymmdd.pdf - note that mmdd must be the last day of the relevant month.)
 pmars.marad.dot.gov MARAD/DOT official data on current inventory and historical records.
 PMARS MARAD Reserve Fleet Current Inventory
 Inside the Ghost Ships of the Mothball Fleet Unauthorized Photo Essay of the NDRF (May 2011)

 Satellite image of the Reserve Fleet in the James River near Fort Eustis, Virginia from Google Maps
 Aerial image of the Reserve Fleet in the Suisun Bay near Benicia, California from Google Maps
 Satellite image of the Reserve Fleet in the Neches River near Beaumont, Texas from Google Maps

 
1946 establishments in the United States
Fleets of the United States Navy
United States Navy Reserve